"Extempore" (alternate title "The Beach Where Time Began") is a science fiction short story  by American writer Damon Knight. It first appeared in the August 1956 issue of Infinity Science Fiction and has been reprinted twice, in Far Out (1961) and The Best of Damon Knight (1976).

Synopsis 
Albert Rossi, a New York dishwasher, learns to travel through time.  Once started, he continues at an accelerated pace, continuing until the end of time and then starting over. By an effort of will he manages to stop at a "scarlet beach with its golden laughing people". But he is now frozen in time forever and appears to the beachcombers as a rock-hard, immobile statue.

Background
About this story, Knight wrote 
Here is another of my time stories, put together out of bits and pieces of Far Rockaway, Milne, Einstein, etc. (I don't see why the speculations of modern physicists shouldn't be used as incantations.)  I don't think "Extempore" is terribly probable, but see for yourself.

References

1956 short stories
Science fiction short stories
Works originally published in Infinity Science Fiction
Short stories by Damon Knight
Short fiction about time travel

de:Extempore
fi:Ex tempore